Yak Ballz, born Yashar Zadeh is an American independent hip hop artist, who was brought up in Flushing, Queens, New York. He is one of the original members of The Weathermen. He is also a member of Cardboard City. Since 2019 he has worked for Warner Bros. Records as Vice President of their Media & Strategic Development team.

Early life and education
Yak turned to writing as an outlet for expression and a form of therapy due to his mother being overprotective about their neighborhood in Queens at the time. At the age of 16 he entered the Braggin' Rites MC battle; he took second place and was the youngest person in the competition. Yak would go on to achieve first runner-up honors two more times after that, but more importantly, the aspiring MC grabbed the attention of several interested people in attendance, including Armando "Mondee" Torres and Brett Scott, who approached Vaz about getting Yak to appear on their new mixtape.

Yak is of Persian heritage.

Yak is a graduate from State University of New York at New Paltz with a Bachelor of Science in business management.

Career
Bobbito Garcia put Yak's demo, "Flossin'," on his CM Famalam show on 89.9-FM WKCR in New York. He later invited Yak to appear on the show in 1998. After a few impressive appearances on WKCR, and "Flossin'" gaining regular rotation, Bobbito approached Yak about some new original music. Yak's lyrics caught the attention of Cage, who was impressed enough to reach out to him; making him an original member of The Weathermen.

Soon after, Yak released his first 12-inch, Homepiss in 2000, courtesy of Bobbito and his Fondle'em label. His 4-song EP was released featuring "Flossin'," "The Plague," "Nasty or Nice," and "Homepiss."

The Freakshow
In 2001, Yak followed up the EP with a three-song vinyl 12-inch, The Freakshow, which was one of the first ever 12-inch releases by the indie hip hop label Definitive Jux. Vinyl specialty stores and Web sites quickly sold out of the three-song 12-inch that featured cover art by TCK brother Ewok One 5MH. El-P even included The Freak Show on 2002's Definitive Jux Presents 2 compilation album.

While You Were Sleeping
In 2003, he released While You Were Sleeping b/w The Drill 12-inch with Traffic Entertainment. Once Eastern Conference Records, then home to fellow Weathermen; Cage and Tame One, heard of this single they moved to sign Yak to an album deal. After working on The Weathermen's Conspiracy mixtape (2003) Yak Ballz released his first album, My Claim in 2004 with guest appearances from both Cage and Tame One. He worked with producer Mondee for production and engineer Joe Raia. His lyrical content on My Claim was fueled by his Queens life and college experiences. After leaving Eastern Conference, Yak put out a mixtape in 2005, The Missing Cassettes consisting of rare and unreleased material.

Scifentology
In 2006 he released Scifentology, a mixtape put out by Yak himself and Scifen clothing company which features cover art by Ewok One 5MH. Yak's lyrics became more introspective and the beats changed on Scifentology by relying more on rock and synthesized instrumentation. The mixtape started as an innocent idea and promotional tool to help cross-market Yak with the Scifen clothing brand, but it quickly became one of the most talked-about mixtapes of the year within the indie hip hop world in '06.

Scifentology II
January 2008, Yak released his sophomore effort, Scifentology II on FloSpot Records in conjunction with Scifen Clothing. Scifentology II features production from the likes of Aesop Rock, the late Camu Tao, Mondee, Chapter 7, Adept, and Chris Maestro TCK. It also has guest appearances from Cage and Tame One. "Dirt Empire," a song produced by Aesop Rock, won the MTVu Best Freshman Video with over 40,000 views.

In 2011, Yak released an extended play called Gas Galaxy, which was self-released in the fall. Yak has performed the title song in support of Cage's Depart From Me tour.

Selected discography

Albums
 My Claim (Eastern Conference Records/Caroline – 2004)
 Scifentology (Scifen Records – 2006)
 Scifentology II (FloSpot Records – 2008)
 Gas Galaxy (self-released – 2012)
 The Rumors Are True [as RÖÖD] (self-released – 2017)

12-inch releases
 "Homepiss" / "Nasty or Nice" b/w "The Plague" / "Flossin" (Fondle'em Records – 2000)
 "The Freakshow" b/w "For the Critics"/ "Reign" (Definitive Jux Records – 2001)
 "The Drill" b/w "While You Were Sleeping" (Jersey Roots Entertainment/Traffic – 2003)

Compilations
 "Flossin" – Farewell Fondle'em (Definitive Jux Records – 2001)
 "The Freakshow" Definitive Jux Presents II (Definitive Jux Records – 2002)
 "5 Left in the Clip" with The Weathermen – Eastern Conference Allstars III (Eastern Conference Records – 2003)
 "Let the Games Begin" feat. Vast Aire – Eastern Conference Allstars IV (Eastern Conference Records – 2004)

Mixtapes
 2005: The Missing Cassettes
 2006: Scifentology: The Mixtape
 2017: The Missing Cassettes 2

Notes and references

External links
YakBallz.net
Yak Ballz Myspace
Yak Ballz TV - YouTube
Yak Ballz IMEEM

1982 births
American people of Iranian descent
Living people
People from Flushing, Queens
Rappers from New York City
State University of New York at New Paltz alumni
21st-century American rappers
The Weathermen (hip hop group) members